Songbook Vol. 1 (full title Songbook Vol. 1 – I più grandi successi) is the first greatest hits compilation released by British singer-songwriter Mika. The album was released on 18 November 2013 in Italy, following Mika's appointment as a judge on the Italian version of The X Factor, and his number one single in the country, "Stardust", featuring Chiara. The new version of "Stardust", "Live Your Life" and a pop edited version of his ballad-oriented hit "Happy Ending" are exclusive to this release, and do not appear on any of Mika's other albums.

After debuting at number four on the Italian Albums Chart, Songbook Vol. 1 peaked at number two in Italy during its second week. The album was later certified double platinum by the Federation of the Italian Music Industry, denoting sales in excess of 120,000 units in Italy.

Track listing

Release history

Charts

Certifications

References

2013 greatest hits albums
Mika (singer) albums